The Vidurashwatha massacre occurred on 25 April 1938 at Vidurashwatha, when police opened fire on agitated farmers and killed 33 people, wounding more than 100. At least 90 rounds were fired by police on unarmed people who assembled to hoist the flag of the Indian National Congress. This massacre led to the Mizra-Patel Pact between Vallabhbhai Patel and Mirza Ismail, which permitted people to hoist the Congress' Flag in Mysore State. The massacre is an instance where the Congress-led freedom movement was violently suppressed by Sir Mirza Ismail and Krishnaraja Wodeyar IV of Mysore State. District Superindent of Police A.S.Khalil started firing with his pistol on unarmed crowd and Government declared that only 10 people died, although total death was 33.

References

Conflicts in 1938
Massacres in 1938
1938 in British India
Protests in British India
Massacres in British India
Political repression in British India
1938 in India
Indian independence movement
April 1938 events